Robert Edward Badham (June 9, 1929 – October 21, 2005) was an American politician from California. He served as a Republican member of the United States House of Representatives from the Orange County-based 40th district from 1977 to 1989.

Biography
Born in Los Angeles, California, Badham graduated from Beverly Hills High School in 1947, and earned his B.A. from Stanford University in 1951. During the Korean War, he served active duty in the United States Naval Reserve. After returning home, he became an executive in his family's Hoffman Hardware Company in Los Angeles.

Badham entered politics in 1962 when he was elected to the California State Assembly where he would serve for fourteen years. As an assemblyman, he co-authored legislation to create personalized license plates and fought to protect tide pools along the Southern California coast. In addition, he was a delegate to the California State Republican conventions during his tenure in the state legislature and was a delegate to the Republican National Conventions from 1964 to 1984.

In 1976, Badham entered a crowded Republican primary for the U.S. House of Representatives in California's 40th congressional district and won with 32% of the vote, besting eight other candidates including former congressman John G. Schmitz and incumbent Andrew J. Hinshaw. He easily won the general election in November, and was reelected five more times in the heavily Republican district which included Irvine and his home of Newport Beach. In Congress, he served as a ranking member on the House Armed Services Committee and was representative to the NATO Parliamentary Assembly.

After retiring from Congress, Badham remained active, serving on the California Board of Accountancy, as vice chairman of the Newport Beach Civil Service Board, and helping to raise money for Hoag Hospital. He died on October 21, 2005 after suffering a heart attack at Balboa Island post office. He was buried at Riverside National Cemetery in Riverside, California.

See also

References

External links

Archival collections
 Guide to the Robert E. Badham Papers. Special Collections and Archives, The UC Irvine Libraries, Irvine, California.

Join California Robert E. Badham

Other

 

1929 births
2005 deaths
20th-century American politicians
Republican Party members of the California State Assembly
Occidental College alumni
Stanford University alumni
United States Navy personnel of the Korean War
Businesspeople from Los Angeles
Politicians from Los Angeles
People from Newport Beach, California
United States Navy reservists
Burials at Riverside National Cemetery
Republican Party members of the United States House of Representatives from California
20th-century American businesspeople